Bengt Gunnar Richard Ahlfors, (born ) is a Finnish-Swedish playwright and author.

Career 
Ahlfors's first encounter with the theatre was in December 1943, when he saw the play Fågel Blå at Helsinki's Swedish Theatre. He said of it that he had "stepped into the fairy tale and actually I have never stepped out". Ahlfors studied Swedish literature, Nordic languages, and political science at the University of Helsinki, and worked as a journalist and critic for Hufvudstadsbladet and Nya Pressen as well as working in radio and television, before graduating with a degree in philosophy in 1967. By the time of Ahlfors's graduation he had already made his theatrical debut with the musical play I våras in 1963, which he created together with his friend Frej Lindqvist, and which ran at the Lilla Teatern. 

After graduation Ahlfors was hired as the director of the Lilla Teatern, where he remained until 1970. During his three years there he directed plays about the Soviet invasion of Czechoslovakia, the regime of the Greek Colonels, and also a comedic adaptation of Jules Verne's Around the World in 80 Days. Following his spell as the Lilla Teatern, Ahlfors was a scholar at Villa Biaudet from 1970 until 1973, and then was artistic director of the Helsinki Swedish Theatre from 1975-1978, where he sparked controversy by making an operetta version of Runberg's Fänrik Ståls sägner, which was criticised as unsuitable for rendering as an operetta.

In 1986 Ahlfors debuted his play Finns det tigrar i Kongo?, which was translated into English as Are there tigers in the Congo?, which he wrote together with Johan Bargum. The played focused on the AIDS pandemic and fears surrounding infection with the disease and prejudices against AIDS carriers. Finns det tigrar i Kongo? has been translated into more than 20 different languages. He also created the play 1945 in 2005 that focused on Finland's history during the second world war. His most recent play as of late 2021, Ahlfors & Siikala, focused on the relationship between him and his wife.

Ahlfors received the Lea Award of the Swedish playwrights association in 1988, and an award from the Ministry of Education and Culture in 1993.

Personal life
Ahlfors has been married to the Finnish director Ritva Siikala since 1968. The pair met in 1965, and cohabited before becoming married due to parental pressure. They had one daughter together who was born in 1968, and adopted a son from Ethiopia in 1972, and as of 2021 had seven grandchildren.

References

 
1937 births
Living people
Swedish-speaking Finns
Finnish dramatists and playwrights
Finnish male writers
University of Helsinki alumni
20th-century Finnish journalists
Finnish theatre directors